The Speedway Grand Prix of Europe was a speedway event that was a part of the Speedway Grand Prix Series.

Winners

Most wins
 
 Jason Crump and Nicki Pedersen 3 times

References

See also
 List of Speedway Grand Prix riders

 
Grand Prix
 
Europe